Haley Alexandra Tju (born February 15, 2001) is an American actress. She is known for her role as Pepper in the Nickelodeon television series Bella and the Bulldogs, and Marcy Wu in the Disney animated television series Amphibia.

Early life
Tju was born in Southern California, and grew up in Chino Hills, California. She began acting at the age of four, and was home schooled. She is of Chinese and Indonesian descent. Her sister Brianne Tju is also an actress.

Career
Her first television appearance was in a commercial for Pizza Hut, while her first TV show performance was a bit part in Hannah Montana at the age of seven. Tju has appeared in television shows, television movies, feature films and a short. Tju has appeared on The Suite Life on Deck where she played Young London in an episode. Later came episode appearances on Desperate Housewives, Jessie, Go On, and The Thundermans. She also appeared in the television movie Den Brother. In 2013, Tju was signed to a talent deal with Nickelodeon after participating in a showcase at the Los Angeles Groundlings Theater.

Her first prominent role was as a voice actor in the children's animated series Monsters vs. Aliens as the character of Sqweep. Next, Tju landed her first leading role in the Nickelodeon television special, The Massively Mixed Up Middle School Mystery, playing one of three young detectives.

Tju also played the main role Pepper Silverstein, the cheerleader best friend of Brec Bassinger's character Bella Dawson on the Nickelodeon television series Bella and the Bulldogs.

Filmography

References

External links

 

2001 births
Living people
21st-century American actresses
Actresses from California
American child actresses
American television actresses
American voice actresses
American people of Chinese descent
American people of Indonesian descent
American people of Chinese-Indonesian descent